The 2000 United States Olympic trials for track and field were held at Hornet Stadium in Sacramento, California. Organised by USA Track and Field, the ten-day competition lasted from July 14 until July 23 and served as the national championships in track and field for the United States.  The men's Marathon trials were held May 7 in Pittsburgh, Pennsylvania.

The results of the event determined qualification for the American Olympic team at the 2000 Summer Olympics, held in Sydney. Provided they had achieved the Olympic "A" standard, the top three athletes gained a place on the Olympic team. In the event that a leading athlete did not hold an "A" standard, or an athlete withdrew, the next highest finishing athlete with an "A" standard was selected instead.

Maurice Greene, who won the 100 meter trial, and Michael Johnson, who won the 400 meter trial and was the defending 200 meter gold medallist, both pulled hamstrings in the 200 meter final.  Neither qualified in that event.

Medal summary
Key:
.

Men

Men track events

Men field events

Notes

Women

Women track events

Women field events

Notes

References

Results
Full Results. USATF. Retrieved on 2015-10-14.

External links
Official webpage at USATF

USA Outdoor Track and Field Championships
US Olympic Trials
Track, Outdoor
United States Summer Olympics Trials
United States Olympic Trials (track and field)
Track and field in California